Dog Eat Dog is the third studio album by American rock band Warrant. It was released on August 25, 1992 on the Columbia label of Sony Music, and was their final album for the label. The album peaked at number 25 on The Billboard 200. It is also the last album to feature all five original members, as Joey Allen and Steven Sweet both left the band in 1994, but returned in 2004.

Production and marketing
Warrant began recording bass and drums for Dog Eat Dog in Los Angeles, California in February 1992. Overdubs were recorded at Morrisound Studios in Tampa, Florida, in March 1992. The record was mixed in at Scream Studios in Studio City, California in April 1992 with producer Michael Wagener.

Apparently conscious of the widely circulated rumour that Joey Allen and Erik Turner had not played on the first two Warrant records, the band had Wagener include a statement in the liner notes that "no artist, except those listed, performed on this album in any capacity whatsoever". Jani Lane wrote in the liner notes: "This album is dedicated to Joey Allen, one of the most under-rated guitarists in rock today."

Shortly after the release of the album, Lane discovered that a large framed poster of Warrant had been removed from the foyer in Columbia Records in Los Angeles and had been replaced by a poster of Seattle band Alice in Chains. It was at this moment, according to Lane, that he realised that "the proverbial writing [was] on the wall" for the band. In the absence of support from the band's label, radio and MTV, and without a major tour to support the record, sales of the album were sluggish compared to the first two albums but achieved "gold" status in the United States and was regarded by critics as Warrant's strongest record.

Songs
The song Machine Gun was the album's first single and featured a music video.

The song "Bitter Pill" which was the second single features an operatic interlude, performed in German by the "Moron Fish & Tackle Choir". The makeshift "Choir" consisted of security guards, engineers, janitors, and others who had been available at or near the recording studio. The song features two different music videos, one with the album version of the song featuring the whole band in the video and one with the acoustic version of the song featuring only Jani Lane in the video. The video for the acoustic version was shot solely outside St Vincent de Paul Church located at 621 West Adams Blvd in South Los Angeles (intersection of West Adams and Figueroa). The Popeyes Restaurant seen across the street in the video still exists today.

"The Hole in My Wall" featuring the use of a talkbox, was released as the third single of the album. 

"Inside Out" often used as a concert intro was also released as a single and “Andy Warhol” was released as a promo single.

"Sad Theresa" had previously been recorded by Jani Lane and Steven Sweet's old band Plain Jane.

Track listing

Personnel
 Jani Lane - vocals, arranger
 Joey Allen - lead guitar
 Erik Turner - rhythm guitar, arrangement
 Jerry Dixon - bass
 Steven Sweet - drums

Additional personnel
 Scott Warren - keyboards

Charts 
Album

Singles

Certifications

Legacy
Hardcore punk band Dog Eat Dog named their debut EP Warrant in a joking 'retaliation' for the title of this album.

References

Warrant (American band) albums
1992 albums
Albums produced by Michael Wagener
Columbia Records albums